Ann Judith Birstein (May 27, 1927 – May 24, 2017) was an American Fulbright Scholar, novelist, memoirist, essayist, film critic, blogger, and professor.

Biography
She was born in the Hell's Kitchen neighborhood of New York City and was the daughter of the notable Rabbi Bernard Birstein of the Actor's Temple. She attended Queens College and published her first novel, Star of Glass, in 1950 at the age of twenty three. She was married to and later divorced the literary critic Alfred Kazin, with whom she had a daughter, Cathrael Kazin. Birstein was also stepmother to professor and author Michael Kazin. She was a former professor of Barnard College.

She died at home in New York on May 24, 2017, following a long illness.

Novels 
 Star of Glass (1950)
 The Troublemaker 
 The Sweet Birds of Gorham
 Summer Situations
 Dickie's List 
 American Children
 The Rabbi on Forty-seventh Street (biography of her father, Rabbi Bernard Birstein)
 The Last of the True Believers
 What I Saw at the Fair (autobiography)
 Vanity Fare (2009)

References

External links
Ann Birstein: Biography connected to the Queens College Ann Birstein papers.

1927 births
2017 deaths
Jewish American novelists
20th-century American novelists
American women novelists
Queens College, City University of New York alumni
Barnard College faculty
American women bloggers
American bloggers
American memoirists
American women memoirists
American film critics
21st-century American novelists
American women essayists
20th-century American women writers
21st-century American women writers
American women film critics
20th-century American essayists
21st-century American essayists
Novelists from New York (state)
21st-century American Jews